Shri Kalyan Das Jain was an independent politician from Agra, Uttar Pradesh, India. He served as Mayor of the city for five consecutive terms from 1963 to 1969.

References

Mayors of places in Uttar Pradesh
Possibly living people
Year of birth missing
People from Agra